The North and South Harbor Bridge is an upcoming cable-stayed bridge that will connect Barangay 20 (Parola) in the North Harbor and Barangay 649 (Baseco Island) in the South Harbor of the Port of Manila. It will cross over the Pasig River and is parallel to the M. Roxas Jr. Bridge (Delpan Bridge). Civil works are expected to begin in 2021 and the bridge is scheduled to be completed and operational by 2023.

Background

The bridge was initially submitted as the Robinson Bridge and is a part of the Pasig-Marikina River and Manggahan Floodway Bridges Project, which aims to construct 12 additional bridges to improve transportation in Metro Manila. The three-span prestressed concrete cable-stayed bridge will have four lanes (two lanes per direction) and three-meter sidewalks on both sides.

References

Proposed bridges in the Philippines
Bridges in Manila
Pasig River